Megachile arcuata is a species of bee in the family Megachilidae. It was described by Theodore Dru Alison Cockerell in 1919.

References

Arcuata
Insects described in 1919